Bernhardt Burghardt Assmus (–unknown) was a German stamp forger operating in London. He was originally from Hamburg.

He was unmasked after Morris Giwelb bought forged Penny Black VR official stamps from him in August 1890. Giwelb accompanied the police on a visit to Assmus' premises at 12 Church Street, Islington, and assisted them at Vine Street Police Station in sorting the seized material.

He was found guilty of fraud in 1892.

References

Further reading
Herst, H. (ed.) (1986) Forensic Philately (An Account of the Famous English Stamp Fraud Trials involving Messrs. Bluett, Benjamin, Sarpy, Jeffryes and Dr. Assmus Originally Published in "The Stamp News", 1890-1892). Lake Oswego, Oregon: Herman Herst Jr.

Stamp forgers
Criminals from Hamburg
Year of death unknown
1850s births
Year of birth uncertain